Mitchell's School Atlas is a series of textbooks written by Samuel Augustus Mitchell in the 19th century, and published by H. Cowperthwait & Company of Philadelphia, Pennsylvania.

Further reading 
 

Geography textbooks
Atlases